Pradip Kumar Bhandari (or Pradeep Kumar Bhandari; Nepali: प्रदीपकुमार भण्डारी) is Nepalese politician who is serving as Speaker of the Koshi Provincial Assembly and Member of Koshi Provincial Assembly from Sundari 1 (A).

References

Living people
Nepalese politicians
Members of the Provincial Assembly of Koshi Province